Wolke may refer to:

surname:
Bruno Wolke, German cyclist
Kay Rudi Wolke, member of Instant Clarity
Manfred Wolke, German boxer
Robert Wolke, professor of chemistry and author

given name:
 Wolke Hegenbarth, German actress

See also
Wolk (surname)

Surnames from given names